Thomas, Tom or Tommy Ryan may refer to:

Politics and military
Thomas Ryan (Commandant) ( 1790–??), soldier and penal administrator
Thomas Ryan (Quebec politician) (1804–1889), businessman and Senator from Quebec
Thomas Ryan (congressman) (1837–1914), Congressional representative from Kansas
Thomas Ryan (Canadian politician) (1849–1937), Canadian politician
Tommy Ryan (politician) (1852–?), Australian politician, member of the Queensland Legislative Assembly
Thomas Ryan (1870–1943), Australian politician, member of both the Victorian Legislative Assembly and South Australian House of Assembly
T. J. Ryan (1876–1921), Australian politician, Premier of Queensland, Australia (1915–1919), also New South Wales Parliament member (1921)
Thomas Jefferson Ryan (1888–1968), Congressional representative from New York
Thomas Ryan (Irish Army officer) (1893–1980), I.R.A. Commander and Lt. Col. Irish Defence Forces
Thomas Ryan (New South Wales politician) (1895–1972), Australian politician, member for Auburn in the New South Wales Legislative Assembly
Thomas J. Ryan (admiral) (1901–1970), American admiral and Medal of Honor recipient
Thomas P. Ryan Jr. (1928–2003), mayor of Rochester, New York
Thomas M. Ryan Jr. (born 1928), United States Air Force general

Business
Thomas Ryan (businessman), executive at CVS Corporation
Thomas Fortune Ryan (1851–1928), U.S. businessman
Tony Ryan (Thomas Anthony Ryan, 1936–2007), Irish founder of Ryanair
Thomas Ryan (businessman), executive at the National Basketball Association (NBA)

Sport

Hurling
Tommy Ryan (1890s hurler) ( 1890s), Irish hurler for Tipperary and Boherlahen-Dualla 
Tommy Ryan (hurler) ( 1940s–1950s), Irish hurler for Tipperary and Thurles Sarsfields 
Tom Ryan (Toomevara hurler) (1941–1970), Irish hurler for Tipperary and Toomevara
Tom Ryan (Killenaule hurler) (1941–2023), Irish hurler for Tipperary and Killenaule
Tom Ryan (Limerick hurler) (born 1944), Irish hurler for Limerick and Ballybrown, later a manager
T. J. Ryan (hurler) (born 1974), Irish hurler for Limerick and Garryspillane
Thomas Ryan (Waterford hurler) (born 1989), Irish hurler for Waterford and Tallow

Other sports
Thomas Ryan (rugby union) (1864–1927), New Zealand rugby player who played for the All Blacks in 1884
Thomas Ryan (cricketer) (1865–1921), Australian cricketer
Tommy Ryan (1870–1948), American bareknuckle boxer
Tommy Ryan (Australian footballer) (1873–1948), Australian rules footballer for Melbourne and St Kilda
Thomas Ryan (American football) ( 1920s), American college football and basketball player
Tom Ryan (Australian footballer) (1924–2017), Australian rules footballer for South Melbourne
Tommy Ryan (rugby league) (born 1930), Australian rugby league footballer
Tommy Ryan (Gaelic footballer) (born 1967), Irish Gaelic footballer
Ogre 2 (Tom Ryan, born 1986), American professional Halo player 
Thomas Ryan (soccer) (born 1987), American soccer player
Tom Ryan (lacrosse) ( 1990s), American professional lacrosse coach and player

Books, music and television
Thomas Ryan (musician) (1827–1903), Irish-American musician
Tom Ryan (Primeval), a fictional character from the TV series Primeval
Colonel Tom Ryan, a fictional character from the CBS drama The Unit played by Robert Patrick
Thomas Ryan (actor), American actor in The Relic
Thomas Jay Ryan (born 1962), stage actor
Tom K. Ryan, creator of the comic strip Tumbleweeds

Other usage
Thomas F. Ryan (1872–1961), inventor of five-pin bowling
Thomas Jervis Ryan (1834–1901), New Zealand policeman
Tom Ryan, Detroit-based disc jockey who went locally by the alter ego Count Scary
Thomas Ryan (bishop) (1915–1983), Bishop of Clonfert, Ireland, 1962–82
Tommy Ryan, an alias of Genovese crime family boss Thomas Eboli

See also

Ryan Thomas (disambiguation)